Taye is the name of an import Flemish noble house.
 Noble House of Taye: The Marquess of Wemmel.
Maria de Taye
François Philippe de Taye, Marquess of Wemmel.
Engelbert de Taye, Lord Mayor of Brussels.
Jacobus de Taye, Lord Mayor of Brussels.

Taye is a male given name of Nigerian and Ethiopian origin that may refer to:
Taye Babalola (born 1991), Nigerian footballer playing in Israel
Taye Biddle (born 1983), American football wide receiver
Tayé-Brook Zerihoun (born 1942), Ethiopian United Nations official
Taye Diggs (born 1971), American theatre, film and television actor
Taye Taiwo (born 1985), Nigerian footballer playing in Turkey
Peter Taiye Oladotun (born 1985), Nigerian footballer playing in Malta
Moges Taye (born 1973), Ethiopian marathon runner
Yemenashu Taye (born 1979), Ethiopian long-distance runner

Ethiopian given names
Amharic-language names
Belgian noble families